Weigand, a German surname, may refer to:

Andrea Weigand (born 1977), Canadian lawn bowler
Andreas Weigand (born 1945), American sprint canoeist
Bill Weigand (born c. 1927), Canadian politician
Geoff Weigand (born 1964), Australian rock climber
Günter Weigand (born 1924), German economist
Gustav Weigand (1860–1930), German linguist
Johannes Weigand (born 1966), German opera director
Peter Weigand (1941–2011), American sprint canoeist
Wilhelm Weigand (1862–1949), German poet and writer
William Weigand (born 1937), American Roman Catholic bishop

See also
Wiegand
Wigand
Weygand
Weigand of Redwitz

Surnames from given names
Surnames of German origin